Newby with Mulwith is a civil parish in the Harrogate district of North Yorkshire, England. Most of the parish consists of the grounds of Newby Hall. Mulwith is a single farm in the south east of the parish. The population of the parish was estimated at 40 in 2013.

Newby with Mulwith was historically a township in the parish of Ripon in the West Riding of Yorkshire.  It became a separate civil parish in 1866.  In 1974 it was transferred to the new county of North Yorkshire.

References 

Civil parishes in North Yorkshire